Lepanthes stenophylla is a species of orchid found from Mexico (Chiapas) to Venezuela.

References

External links 

stenophylla
Orchids of Venezuela
Orchids of Chiapas